The world governing body for air sports and aeronautics and astronautics world records, the Fédération Aéronautique Internationale (FAI), was founded on 14 October 1905. The Royal Aero Club is the authority which administers the above activities for the United Kingdom.

With effect from 1 March 1910, the rules governing the authorisation of Aviators' certificate awarded in another country were as follows: "... Foreigners belonging to a country represented on the F.A.I, can only receive a certificate from the Royal Aero Club of the United Kingdom after having obtained the consent from the national
sporting authority approved by the F.A.I. But a certificate may also be granted to a foreigner whose country is not represented on the F.A.I., without further application."

The rules governing the award of Aviators' Certificates, amended with effective from 3 January 1914, were as follows:
"The Sporting Authority governing aviation in each country represented on the F.A.I, can alone grant Aviators' Certificates to all candidates, of at least 18 years of age, and coming under its jurisdiction.
 To candidates of the same nationality as the Club.
 To foreigners belonging to a country not represented on the F.A.I.
 To foreigners of a country represented on the F.A.I.; but in this case the certificate can only be delivered with the authorisation of the Sporting Authority of the candidate's country."

List
Note: This list is limited to the given period of time because from 1914 the numbers of pilots increased significantly with the onset of World War I.

See also
Lists of pilots awarded an Aviator's Certificate by the Royal Aero Club 1910–1914:
1910
1911
1912
1913
1914

References

Aviation pioneers
Lists of aviators
Aviat
Aviat
1910s in transport
1910s in the United Kingdom
List